Sigfred Jensen (6 March 1909 – 10 October 1986) was a Danish footballer. He played in six matches for the Denmark national football team from 1933 to 1939.

References

External links
 

1909 births
1986 deaths
Danish men's footballers
Denmark international footballers
Place of birth missing
Association footballers not categorized by position